Borăscu is a commune in Gorj County, Oltenia, Romania. It is composed of seven villages: Baniu, Borăscu, Calapăru, Gura-Menți, Menții din Dos, Miluta and Scorușu.

References

Communes in Gorj County
Localities in Oltenia